The BBC News at Six is the evening news programme bulletin from the BBC. Produced by BBC News, the programme is broadcast on the BBC News channel and on British television channel BBC One on weekdays at 6:00pm. For a long period, the BBC News at Six was the most watched news programme in the UK but since 2006 it has been overtaken by the BBC News at Ten (10:00pm). On average it is watched by four million viewers.

The programme is presented by Fiona Bruce, George Alagiah, Sophie Raworth, Clive Myrie and Reeta Chakrabarti.

Huw Edwards occasionally appears in the event of a major news story and as a backup presenter for when other hosts are unavailable.

In late 2007 the length of the programme was shortened from 30 minutes to 28 minutes to allow for a news summary being shown on BBC One at 7:58pm.

On 8 May 2017, SBS in Australia began airing BBC News at Six during their English-language news programming segment. It is broadcast at 7:00am every day on delay from Britain.

During the COVID-19 pandemic, the bulletin was extended to 33 minutes.

History
The programme launched on 3 September 1984, replacing the early evening news magazine Sixty Minutes and was originally presented by Sue Lawley and Nicholas Witchell. Later Newsnight presenter Jeremy Paxman was relief newsreader from 10 September. Andrew Harvey, Philip Hayton, and Frances Coverdale were also regular relief presenters in the early years. 

In 1988, the Six O'Clock News studio was invaded during a live broadcast by a female group protesting against Britain's Section 28 (a law against the "promotion" of homosexuality in schools).  Witchell grappled with the protesters and is said to have sat on one woman, provoking the memorable front-page headline in the Daily Mirror, "Beeb man sits on lesbian". Lawley left the Six O'Clock News later that year, followed by Witchell a year later, although he would return as a relief presenter intermittently until 1999. From 1989, the programme was mainly presented by two of Peter Sissons, Anna Ford, Andrew Harvey and Moira Stuart, with other BBC journalists such as Witchell, Hayton, John Humphrys, Michael Buerk, Jill Dando, Laurie Mayer, Mike Smartt and Chris Lowe also occasionally presenting.

On 13 April 1993, the bulletin was relaunched with a more coherent look that was adopted across all BBC newscasts on the same day. A year later, Sissons departed to present the Nine O'Clock News, swapping positions with Martyn Lewis. From 1994 to 1999 the programme was generally presented by Lewis as lead presenter of the programme on Monday, Tuesday and Friday, with Ford taking on the lead role on Wednesday and Thursday, although both would cover each other's absences. Stuart was co-presenter on Monday and Tuesday, Harvey on Wednesday and Dando on Thursday and Friday. Other BBC journalists, in particular Jennie Bond, covered in the absence of co-presenters, with future lead presenters Huw Edwards and Fiona Bruce making occasional appearances. Senior journalists, including Witchell, Sissons and John Humphrys would present as lead anchor when both Lewis and Ford were unavailable.

On 10 May 1999, the bulletin was relaunched again, along with the rest of the BBC News programmes and the new presenter was Huw Edwards with Fiona Bruce as the deputy presenter. During Bruce's maternity leave in 2001, Sian Williams, who was special correspondent for the programme at this time, covered as deputy presenter. Both Edwards and Bruce left the Six O'Clock News on 19 January 2003 to front the Ten O'Clock News.

On 20 January 2003, as George Alagiah and Sophie Raworth took over, the bulletin was relaunched along with the rest of BBC One's news bulletins. During Raworth's first maternity leave in 2004, Sian Williams stood in for her for over the six months. However, during Raworth's second maternity leave at the end of 2005, Natasha Kaplinsky stood in, originally as a temporary measure. As part of a presenter reshuffle in April 2006, Kaplinsky was confirmed as the new full-time presenter. Sophie Raworth was later named as the main presenter of the BBC News at One. Raworth is now a regular presenter on the News at Six and BBC News at Ten, covering for main presenters during their absences.

Since April 2005, the programme has formed the first half-hour of the Six O'Clock Newshour on the BBC News Channel. The second half-hour consists of business and sport updates presented from within the News Channel studio by one of the News Channel presenters. As before, the bulletin still completes at 6:30pm before splitting off to regional news programmes on BBC One.

On 5 October 2007 it was announced that Natasha Kaplinsky was leaving the BBC to replace Kirsty Young on 5 News, taking up her new role on 18 February 2008 presenting two half-hour evening bulletins. She left at the end of the Six O'Clock News on the same day.

For a while Sian Williams filled in as co-presenter, but on 3 December 2007 the programme went single-headed, with George Alagiah as main presenter, and Sian Williams as deputy presenter. A few months into the new arrangement Fiona Bruce took over from Sian as the main Friday presenter.

On 28 January 2008, the programme moved studios, from N6 to TC7, as part of a restructuring across BBC News. On 21 April 2008 the programmes, along with the rest of BBC News, underwent a refresh, taking on new titles and a new set.

On 17 March 2013, the BBC News at Six bulletin presented by Sophie Raworth was the final programme to be broadcast from TC7 in BBC Television Centre, after BBC Breakfast and Newsnight vacated the studio in 2012. The studio was demolished later in 2013 as part of the redevelopment of the site. On 18 March 2013, the programme moved to Broadcasting House, along with the BBC News channel and the other BBC One bulletins, and began broadcasting in high-definition.

Alagiah was diagnosed with bowel cancer in 2014, and took leave from presenting duties. Raworth and Bruce were the main cover presenters during this time, which also saw regular appearances from Reeta Chakrabarti and Jane Hill. Alagiah returned in late 2015, but saw his cancer return in 2018, and once again took leave to undergo further treatment. Raworth once again covered Alagiah during his absence, with Bruce, Chakrabarti, Hill and Clive Myrie also regularly appearing on the programme. Alagiah returned to his presenting duties in January 2019.

After eleven years in the role, in January 2019, Fiona Bruce stepped down as the programme's regular presenter on Fridays in order to replace David Dimbleby on Question Time. Sophie Raworth serves as the regular presenters on Fridays, with Bruce usually appearing on the programme on a Monday and as a backup relief presenter on Tuesdays and Wednesdays.

Presenters

Current presenters

Former presenters
If there is no position before the years of being a presenter, then this newsreader was either a relief presenter or occasional guest stand-in presenter.
 Sue Lawley (Main co-presenter, 1984–1988)
 Jeremy Paxman (1984–1985)
 Nicholas Witchell (Main co-presenter, 1984–1998)
 Philip Hayton (1985–1992)
 Frances Coverdale (1986)
 Debbie Thrower (1987–1988)
 Andrew Harvey (Main co-presenter, 1985–1999)
 Laurie Mayer (1988–1993)
 Mike Smartt (1988–1994)
 Jill Dando (1989–1999), Main co-presenter 1994–1999
 John Humphrys (1989–1999)
 Anna Ford (Main co-presenter, 1989–1999)
 Chris Lowe (1989–1993)
 Peter Sissons (Main co-presenter, 1989–1994)
 Moira Stuart (Main co-presenter, 1989–1999)
 Jennie Bond (1993–1999)
 Edward Stourton (journalist) (1993–1999)
 Martyn Lewis (Main co-presenter, 1994–1999)
 Justin Webb (1995–1999)
 Michael Buerk (1996)
 Jon Sopel (1997–2007)
 Diana Madill (1997)
 Clarence Mitchell (1997–1999)
 Sian Williams (2000–2013)
 Darren Jordon (2001–2005)
 Bill Turnbull (2003–2005)
 Dermot Murnaghan (2003–2007)
 Natasha Kaplinsky (Main co-presenter, 2005–2007)
 Nicholas Owen (2007–2010)
 Ben Brown (2006–2008)
 Matt Frei (2008–2009)
 Emily Maitlis (2009–2015)
 Simon McCoy (2019)

Presentation

Unlike the other BBC News bulletins that were broadcast from BBC Television Centre, the BBC News at Six was broadcast from TC7, which until 2012 housed Newsnight, Newsround, The Politics Show and The Andrew Marr Show, most of which moved to Broadcasting House. The programme would occasionally be broadcast from the BBC News channel studio (N6). Since the move to Broadcasting House the bulletin is broadcast from Studio E, the same studio as the BBC News channel and other national bulletins. The current set design and titles were introduced in March 2013.

Within the last few minutes of each bulletin, a full national weather forecast is presented by Helen Willetts, Alina Jenkins, Susan Powell or Louise Lear of the BBC Weather centre. The final full national weather forecast on the BBC News at Six, broadcast from Studio TC7, was presented by Nick Miller.

In October 2018, due to technical difficulties at the Broadcasting House, Fiona Bruce was forced to present from the Millbank Studios

On 26 May 2022, the BBC announced that the BBC News at Six and Ten, along with BBC Breakfast will be revamped in June 2022 to include a completely new studio and presentation, as part of a wider rebrand of the BBC in general. Local regional programmes will also be revamped over the coming months to tie in with the regional BBC channels broadcasting in HD by the beginning of 2023.

Production
The current editor since 2013 is Paul Royall.

Criticism
The bulletin has been accused of being an example of the BBC 'dumbing-down' with more consumer-led reports and dynamic presentation. In particular, in 2006 the then Leader of the House of Commons Jack Straw berated the programme's presenters for "prancing around the studio".

The BBC defend the format as they believe that the body language and integration of presenter and graphics increase the viewer's understanding of the news.

The bulletin has also been accused of having an English perspective on the news in terms of items covered and priority each news item is given. There have been calls in Scotland for a separate Scottish Six that would combine Scottish, British and international news items to create a news programme from a Scottish perspective. The idea was rejected by the BBC in 2003 after a series of public meetings and a poll showed that 38% favoured the idea, as opposed to the 45% that wanted no change. However, the SNP have continued to call for the change.

See also

 ITV Evening News

References

External links
 
 

1984 British television series debuts
1990s British television series
2000s British television series
2010s British television series
2020s British television series
BBC television news shows